Sherif Genedy (born April 3, 1979) is an Egyptian basketball player for Gezira and the Egyptian national team, where he participated at the 2014 FIBA Basketball World Cup.

References

1979 births
Living people
Egyptian men's basketball players
Point guards
Shooting guards
2014 FIBA Basketball World Cup players